Blowback is a term originating from within the Central Intelligence Agency, explaining the unintended consequence and unwanted side-effects of a covert operation. 
To the civilians suffering the blowback of covert operations, the effect typically manifests itself as "random" acts of political violence without a discernible, direct cause; because the public—in whose name the intelligence agency acted—are unaware of the effected secret attacks that provoked revenge (counter-attack) against them.

Etymology
Originally, blowback was CIA internal coinage denoting the unintended, harmful consequences—to friendly populations and military forces—when a given weapon is used beyond its purpose as intended by the party supplying it. Examples include anti-Western religious figures (e.g. Osama bin Laden) who, in due course, attack foe and sponsor; right-wing counter-revolutionaries who sell drugs to their sponsor's civil populace (see CIA and Contras cocaine trafficking in the US); and banana republic juntas (see Salvadoran Civil War) who kill American reporters or nuns (e.g. Dorothy Kazel).

In formal print usage, the term blowback first appeared in the Clandestine Service History—Overthrow of Premier Mossadeq of Iran—November 1952–August 1953, the CIA's internal history of the 1953 Iranian coup d'état, sponsored by the American and British governments, which was published in March 1954. Blowback from this operation would indeed occur with the Iranian Revolution and the Iran hostage crisis. Recent accounts of how blowback functioned in the War on Terror relation to US and UK intelligence  and defense propaganda and became an important issue in a 21st Century media environment are discussed by Emma Briant in her book Propaganda and Counter-terrorism which presents first hand accounts and discussions of deliberate and unintended consequences of blowback, oversight and impacts for the public.

Examples

Nicaragua and Iran-Contra
In the 1980s, blowback was a central theme in the legal and political debates about the efficacy of the Reagan Doctrine, which advocated public and secret support of anti-Communist counter-revolutionaries.  For example, by secretly funding the secret war of the militarily-defeated, right-wing Contras against the left-wing Sandinista government of Nicaragua, which led to the Iran–Contra Affair, wherein the Reagan Administration sold American weapons to Iran (a state unfriendly to the US) to arm the Contras with Warsaw Pact weapons, and their consequent drug-dealing in American cities. Moreover, in the case of Nicaragua v. United States, the International Court of Justice ruled against the United States' secret military attacks against Sandinista Nicaragua, because the countries were not formally at war.

Reagan Doctrine advocates, such as the Heritage Foundation, argued that support for anti-Communists would topple Communist régimes without retaliatory consequences to the United States and help win the global Cold War.

Afghanistan and Al Qaeda
Examples of blowback include the CIA's financing and support for Afghan insurgents to fight an anti-Communist proxy guerilla war against the USSR in Afghanistan; some of the beneficiaries of this CIA support may have joined al-Qaeda's terrorist campaign against the United States.

Syria and ISIS
During the Syrian Civil War, United States  and Saudi Arabia supported and aided anti-Assad armed groups. Some of those groups later shifted loyalty to ISIS.

Yevno Azef and Russian Imperial secret police

Russian socialist revolutionary Yevno Azef, as a paid police informant, provided the Russian  secret-police Okhrana with information to allow them to arrest an influential member of the Socialist Revolutionary Party. After the arrest, Azef assumed the vacant position and organized assassinations, including those of the director of Imperial Russia's police and later Minister of the Interior Vyacheslav Plehve (1904) and Grand Duke Sergei Alexandrovich, the Tsar's uncle (1905). By 1908, Azef was playing the double role of a revolutionary assassin and police spy who received 1000 rubles a month from the authorities.

Soviet disinformation blowback 
Soviet intelligence, as part of active measures, frequently spread disinformation to distort their adversaries' decision-making. However, sometimes this information filtered back through the KGB's own contacts, leading to distorted reports.  Lawrence Bittman also addressed Soviet intelligence blowback in The KGB and Soviet Disinformation, stating that "There are, of course, instances in which the operator is partially or completely exposed and subjected to countermeasures taken by the government of the target country."

See also

 Allegations of CIA assistance to Osama bin Laden
 Boomerang effect (psychology)
 French Connection
 Guatemalan Civil War
 Office of Public Diplomacy
 Plausible deniability
 Reagan Doctrine
 Unintended consequences

People
 Chalmers Johnson
 João Goulart
 Mohammad Mosaddeq
 Qasem Soleimani

References
 Blowback: The Costs and Consequences of American Empire, by Chalmers Johnson, 

Intelligence operations
Revenge